Ǵopčeli is a village in the municipality of Dojran, North Macedonia.

Demographics
As of the 2021 census, Ǵopčeli had 116 residents with the following ethnic composition:
Turks 104
Persons for whom data are taken from administrative sources 10
Others 2

According to the 2002 census, the village had a total of 155 inhabitants. Ethnic groups in the village include:
Turks 151
Bosniaks 1
Others 3

References

Villages in Dojran Municipality
Turkish communities in North Macedonia